Veerapandiyapuram is a 2022 Indian Tamil-language action film written and directed by Suseenthiran and produced by Lendi Studio. The film stars Jai and Meenakshi Govindarajan with a supporting cast including Aakanksha Singh, Bala Saravanan, Kaali Venkat, Harish Uthaman, Sharath Lohithaswa and Jayaprakash. The film was released in theatres on 17 February 2022.

Cast

Production
The film's title was changed from Shiva Shiva to Veerapandiyapuram in February 2022.

Soundtrack 
The soundtrack is composed by Jai in his debut as composer, and the album features three songs.

Reception 
The film opened to mixed reviews. Siby Jeyya of India Herald wrote, "Veerapandiayapuram may have been a good film if the storyline had more depth and better storytelling."  Logesh Balachandran of The Times of India  rated the film with 2/5 stars, stating that, "Veerapandiayapuram could have been a better film if the writing was better with depth in the screenplay." Navein Darshan of Cinema Express gave a rating of 1.5 out on 5 and called the film as an uninventive, dull revenge drama.

However, A Critic from Maalai Malar noted that "Kudos to Jai who is making his debut as a music director with this film. However, the songs in his music did not attract much attention. Aziz's background score is the strength of the film. Cinematographer Velraj has shown the rural beauty of Dindigul in his own style."

References

External links 
 

2022 action drama films
Films directed by Suseenthiran
Indian action drama films
Indian films about revenge
Indian rape and revenge films